Bembidion acticola is a species of beetle in the family Carabidae. It is found in the East Coast of the United States.

References

acticola
Beetles of the United States
Beetles described in 1884